Chrysorthenches glypharcha is a species of moth in the family Plutellidae. It was first described by Edward Meyrick in 1919. It is endemic to New Zealand and is found in the North and South Islands. This species inhabits native forest with Podocarpus trees present. The larva and pupa of this species is currently unknown but the adults are on the wing in February, October and November. The adult moths are associated with Podocarpus totara and Podocarpus laetus.

Taxonomy 
This species was first described by Edward Meyrick in 1919 and named Orthenches glypharcha. In 1927 Alfred Philpott discussed and described the male genitalia of this species. George Hudson discussed and illustrated this species in his 1928 book The butterflies and moths of New Zealand. In 1996 John S. Dugdale placed this species in the genus Chrysorthenches. The female lectotype, collected by George Hudson at Mount Taranaki in February, is held at the Natural History Museum, London.

Description

Meyrick described this species as follows:
Some specimens of C. glypharcha are similar in appearance to C. polita.

Distribution 

This species is endemic to New Zealand and has been found on both the North and South Islands. As well as the type locality this species has been observed at the Motueka Valley, Arthur's Pass and Christchurch.

Behaviour 
Adults are on the wing in February, October and November.

Habitat 
This species inhabits native forest with Podocarpus trees.

Hosts 
The larva and pupa are unknown but the adults of this species are associated with Podocarpus totara and Podocarpus laetus.

DNA analysis 
In 2020 this species along with the other species in the genus Chrysorthenches had their morphological characters studied.

References

Moths described in 1919
Plutellidae
Moths of New Zealand
Endemic fauna of New Zealand
Taxa named by Edward Meyrick
Endemic moths of New Zealand